Lars Betker (born 29 September 1971) is a German former weightlifter. He competed in the men's middle heavyweight event at the 2000 Summer Olympics.

References

External links
 

1971 births
Living people
German male weightlifters
Olympic weightlifters of Germany
Weightlifters at the 2000 Summer Olympics
People from Wriezen
Sportspeople from Brandenburg